The original word base of Esperanto contained around 900 root words and was defined in Unua Libro ("First Book"), published by L. L. Zamenhof in 1887. In 1894, Zamenhof published the first Esperanto dictionary, Universala vortaro ("International Dictionary"), which was written in five languages and supplied a larger set of root words, adding 1740 new words.

The rules of the Esperanto language allow speakers to borrow words as needed, recommending only that they look for the most international words, and that they borrow one basic word and derive others from it, rather than borrowing many words with related meanings. Since then, many words have been borrowed from other languages, primarily those of Western Europe. In recent decades, most of the new borrowings or coinages have been technical or scientific terms; terms in everyday use are more likely to be derived from existing words (for example  [a computer], from  [to compute]), or extending them to cover new meanings (for example  [a mouse], now also signifies a computer input device, as in English). There are frequent debates among Esperanto speakers about whether a particular borrowing is justified, or whether the need can be met by derivation or extending the meaning of existing words.

Origins

Esperanto occupies a middle ground between "naturalistic" constructed languages such as Interlingua, which take words en masse from their source languages with little internal derivation, and a priori conlangs such as Solresol, in which the words have no historical connection to other languages. In Esperanto, root words are borrowed and retain much of the form of their source language, whether the phonetic form ( from ex-) or orthographic form ( from team).

Word formation
One of the ways Zamenhof made Esperanto easier to learn than ethnic languages was by creating a regular and highly productive derivational morphology. Through the judicious use of lexical affixes (prefixes suffixes), the core vocabulary needed for communication was greatly reduced, making Esperanto a more agglutinative language than most European languages. It has been estimated that on average one root in Esperanto is the communicative equivalent of ten words in English.

However, a contrary tendency is apparent in cultured and Greco-Latin technical vocabulary, which most Europeans see as "international" and therefore take into Esperanto en masse, despite the fact they are not truly universal. Many Asians consider this to be an onerous and unnecessary burden on the memory, when it is so easy to derive equivalent words internally (for example by calquing them, which is what Chinese often does). This sparks frequent debates as to whether a particular root is justified, and sometimes results in duplicates of native and borrowed vocabulary. An example is "calligraphy", which occurs both as a calqued  ("writing of beauty") and as the direct borrowing . A similar development has also occurred in English (brotherly vs. fraternal), German ( vs.  for ornithology), Japanese ( vs.  for baseball), Spanish ( vs.  for basketball), French ( vs. ), and other languages. However, although the debates in ethnic languages are motivated by nationalism or issues of cultural identity, in Esperanto the debates are largely motivated by differing views on how to make the language practical and accessible.

Affixes
One of the most immediately useful derivational affixes for the beginner is the prefix , which derives antonyms:  (heavy),  (light);  (upwards),  (downwards);  (to love),  (to hate);  (light),  (darkness). However, except in jokes, this prefix is not used when an antonym exists in the basic vocabulary:  (south), not "malnorda" from 'north';  (to be lacking, intr.), not "malesti" from 'to be'.

What follows is a list of what are usually called "affixes". Most of them, however, are actually lexical roots, in that they can be used as independent words and their relative order in a compound is determined by semantics, not grammar. They are called "affixes" mainly because they derive from affixes in Esperanto's source languages. Some are true affixes in that, although they may be used independently, their order within a word is fixed by the grammar. Only a few cannot be used independently and so correspond to how a typical affix behaves in English.

When a root receives more than one affix, their order matters, because affixes modify the entire stem they are attached to. That is, the outer ones modify the inner ones. Most affixes are themselves roots, and as such have an inherent part of speech. This is indicated by the final part-of-speech vowel in the suffix list below. A few affixes do not affect the part of speech of the root; for the suffixes listed in the tables below, this is indicated by a hyphen in place of the final vowel.

List of lexical suffixes

List of prefixes

A proposed suffix  makes adjectives out of nouns made from adjectives:  (caloric, from  warm),  (nationalize).

Lexical (i.e. derivational) affixes may act as roots by taking one of the grammatical suffixes:  (opposite),  (slight),  (a member),  (a doohickey),  (possibly),  (to become),  (a bit, a crumb). Also, through compounding, lexical roots may act as affixes:  (to see),  (to be able to),  (able to see, not blind);  (head, chief),  (a city),  (a capital).

Compounds
Compound words in Esperanto are similar to English, in that the final root is basic to the meaning. The roots may be joined together directly, or with an epenthetic (linking) vowel to aid pronunciation. This epenthetic vowel is most commonly the nominal suffix , used regardless of number or case, but other grammatical suffixes may be used when the inherent part of speech of the first root of the compound needs to be changed.

 (a songbird) versus  (a birdsong)
 (a sailship) versus  (a ship sail)
 (a centennial [a year of a hundred]) versus  (a century [a hundred of years])
 (expensive, with an adverbial )

Prepositions are frequently found in compounds, and behave much like prefixes,
 (to consider something) versus  (to think about something).

Since affixes may be used as root words, and roots may combine like affixes, the boundary between the two is blurred. Many so-called affixes are indistinguishable from other roots. However, "true" affixes are grammatically fixed as being either prefixes or suffixes, whereas the order of roots in compounds is determined by semantics.

This reflects the general lack of geminate consonants in Esperanto.
(conclusion).

Reduplication
Reduplication is only marginally used in Esperanto. It has an intensifying effect similar to that of the suffix . Reduplication has only used with monosyllabic roots that do not require an epenthetic vowel when compounded.

Some examples
 (a [female] lover)
 (lovable)
 (loving)
 (to feel distaste for)

 (hopeful [of a situation: inspiring hope])
 (hopeful [of a person: tending to hope])
 (the Esperanto community)
 (broken Esperanto)

Affixes may be used in novel ways, creating new words that don't exist in any national language. Sometimes the results are poetic: In one Esperanto novel, a man opens an old book with a broken spine, and the yellowed pages  [from the root  (free) and the affixes  and ]. There is no equivalent way to express this in English, but it creates a very strong visual image of the pages escaping the book and scattering over the floor. More importantly, the word is comprehensible the first time one hears it.

Derivation by affix greatly expands a speaker's vocabulary, sometimes beyond what they know in their native language. For instance, the English word  (a single lens of a compound eye) is rather obscure, but a child would be able to coin an Esperanto equivalent, from  'an eye' (or perhaps, more precisely, by first coining  for 'a compound eye'). In this way the Esperanto root  (see) regularly corresponds to some two dozen English words: see (saw, seen), sight, blind, vision, visual, visible, nonvisual, invisible, unsightly, glance, view, vista, panorama, observant etc., though there are also separate Esperanto roots for some of these concepts.

Perhaps half of these words are in common use, but the others (and more) are available if needed.

Correlatives

The correlatives are a paradigm of pro-forms, used to ask and answer the questions what, where, when, why, who, whose, how, how much, and what kind. They are constructed from set elements so that correlatives with similar meanings have similar forms: There are nine endings corresponding to the nine wh- questions, and five initial elements that perform the functions of asking, answering, denying, being inclusive, and being indefinite about these nine questions. Thus by learning these 14 elements the speaker acquires a paradigm of 45 adverbs and pronouns.

The correlatives beginning with  have a double function, as interrogative and relative pronouns and adverbs, just as the wh- words do in English:  (Which horse?);  (The horse that ran away).

However, adjectival correlatives do agree in number and case with the nouns they modify, as any other adjectives:  (The horses which I saw).

Table of correlatives

Correlative particles
Several adverbial particles are used primarily with the correlatives:  indicates generality,  indicates proximity, and  indicates distance.

 (whatever)
 (anything)
 (that [general]) [cannot modify a noun]
 (that one) [can modify a noun:  (that boy)]
 (those)
 (this one)
 (that one yonder)
 (hither [to here])
 (each/every dog)
 (all dogs)
 (all these dogs)

An extension of the original paradigm
Sometimes the correlative system is extended to the root  (other), at least when the resulting word is unambiguous,
 (in another way),  (someone else's).
, however, would be ambiguous as to whether the original meaning "otherwise" or the correlative "elsewhere" were intended, so  (from  "place") is used for "elsewhere".

Interrogative vs relative pronouns
Examples of the interrogative versus relative uses of the  words:

  (Who stole my ring?)
  (The police haven't caught the thieves who[plural] stole my ring.)

  (How did you do that?)
  (I don't know how to do that.)

Also,

  (What kind of man is he?)
  (What a man!)

Derivatives
The same form is used for asking time: , literally "How-manyeth hour is it?"]

Gender

Usually, feminine nouns are derived from epicene (genderless) roots via the suffix . A relatively small number of Esperanto roots are semantically masculine or feminine. In some but not all cases, masculine roots also have feminine derivatives via . Usage is consistent for only a few dozen words. For others, people may differ in usage, or it may be difficult to tell whether a word is gendered because of social custom or because of the word itself.

Masculine roots
A small (and decreasing) number of noun roots, mostly titles and kinship terms, are inherently masculine unless the feminine suffix  or the inclusive prefix  are added.

The original setup
Many domestic animals were also masculine ( "bull",  "billygoat",  "rooster"). These generally became gender-neutral over the course of the century, as many similar words did in English, because of social transformation.

Once such a word is used ambiguously by a significant number of speakers or writers, it can no longer be assumed to be masculine. Language guides suggest using all ambiguous words neutrally, and many people find this the least confusing approach—and so the ranks of masculine words gradually dwindle.

The current situation
There is still variation in many of the above words, depending on the social expectations and language background of the speaker. Many of the words are not clearly either masculine or epicene today.

There are several dozen clearly masculine roots:
Words for boys and men:  (bachelor – the feminine  is used for 'miss'),  (boy),  (man).
For example, though  (pharaoh) may be said to be masculine, Hatshepsut is described not only as a  but as a female .
Religious orders that have feminine equivalents:  (abbot),  (monk).
Male mythological figures:  (cyclopes),  (leprechaun), etc. These do not take the suffix . There are relatively few mythological terms that can only be masculine.
Dedicated masculine words for domestic animals that have a separate epicene root:  (buck),  (stallion),  (bull). These do not take the suffix .
Words for castrated beings:  (eunuch),  (castrated rooster),  (castrated bull). These do not take the suffix .
A word for male: .

The others remain masculine mainly because Zamenhof did not establish a way to derive masculine words the way he did for feminine words. To partially remedy this, the root  (man) has long been used to form the masculine of animal words. Originally a suffix, since the 1926 publication of the Esperanto translation of the Bible it has shifted in use to a prefix, but either way the resulting words are ambiguous. More recently, the word  (masculine) was created as an unambiguous alternative.

Feminine roots
There are several dozen feminine roots that do not normally take the feminine suffix :
Words for women:  (lady),  (matron),  (shrew/bitch, from mythology);
Female professions:  (almah),  (geisha),  (concubine),  (prostitute),  (odalisque),  (prima donna),  (soubrette);
Female mythological figures:  (Amazon),  (Fury),  (Muse),  (nymph),  (siren), etc.
Special words for female domestic animals:  (heifer)
Spayed animals:  (poulard)
Words for female: , .

Like the essentially masculine roots (those that do not take the feminine suffix), feminine roots are rarely interpreted as epicene. However, many of them are feminine because of social custom or the details of their mythology, and there is nothing preventing masculine usage in fiction.

Feminine personal names
(Though suffixed  is also available, it is seldom seen.) Some writers extend this  convention to all female names.

Gendered pronouns
Esperanto personal pronouns distinguish gender in the third-person singular:  (he),  (she); but not in the plural:  (they).

See the discussions at gender reform in Esperanto.

Antonyms
However, they are rarely used in conversation.
This is a combination of two factors: the great ease and familiarity of using the  prefix, and the relative obscurity of most of the alternatives, which would hamper communication.

The reason for the popularity of  may be similar: perhaps official , with the repeated continuants m_l, sounds too soft to mean "hard", while  begins with a stop consonant.
Other antonymic words tend to have a different scope.

The antonymic prefix is highly productive among native-speaking children.

Proper names

Proper names may either be
 translated into Esperanto:   "John"
 fully assimilated (respelled in the Esperanto alphabet and given the inflectional suffix -o of nouns). These can then be inflected like normal Esperanto nouns:
  "Roosevelt"
  "the Roosevelts"
 in accusative case:  "Now I will describe Roosevelt."
 changed to another part of speech:  "the Roosevelt mansion"
 combined with other roots and affixes:  "descendants of the Roosevelts"
 partially assimilated, i.e. respelled only:  "Condoleezza Rice", or
 left in the original orthography: .
The last method is usually used only for names or transliterations of names in Latin script. As noted under Gender, feminine personal names may take the suffix a rather than o even when fully assimilated.

When a name ending in a vowel is fully assimilated, the vowel is often changed to inflectional o, rather than the o being added to the full root. As with borrowed common nouns, this may be criticized if the vowel is part of the root rather than inflectional in the source language, because the resulting form may not be readily recognized by native speakers of the source language. However, it is a common phenomenon in inflectional languages such as Russian or Latin. If a name is not fully assimilated, the accusative case may be tacked on with a hyphen, as -n if the name ends in a vowel, or as -on if it does not.

Idioms and slang
Some idiomatic expressions have either been borrowed from Esperanto's source languages, or developed naturally over the course of Esperanto's history. There are also various expletives based on body functions and religion, as in English.

Idioms
In addition to the root words and the rules for combining them, a learner of Esperanto must learn some idiomatic compounds that are not entirely straightforward.

Contractions
Similarly:
 (Esperanto)
 (from  'and/or')
 (from  'he/she' and  's/he')
 (from  'is, are, am')
In the contraction  the stress shifts to the temporal suffix, which makes the tenses easier to distinguish than they are in formal , and effectively recapturing some of the stress patterns of Proto-Esperanto (see below).

Word play
Sometimes Esperanto derivational morphology is used to create humorous alternatives to existing roots. For instance, with the antonym prefix , one gets,
However, such terms are usually coined to translate from English or other languages, and are rarely heard in conversation.

Cultural "in" words
Esperanto has some slang in the sense of in-group talk as well. Some of this is borrowed; for example,  (to whistle about something) means not to care about it, as in German. Other expressions deriving from Esperanto history or dealing with specifically Esperantist concerns have arisen over the years. A , for example, is something needlessly incomprehensible, derived from the name of the more complex and less immediately readable constructed language Volapük, which preceded Esperanto by a few years.

Words and phrases reflect what speakers of a language talk about. Tellingly, Esperanto has a slang expression  (to crocodile) for speaking a language other than Esperanto when Esperanto would be more appropriate, such as at an Esperanto convention, whereas there is nothing equivalent in English.

Jargon
Technical jargon exists in Esperanto as it does in English, and this is a major source of debate in the language: whether international jargon should be borrowed into Esperanto, or whether more transparent equivalents should be constructed from existing roots.

However, the normal wordplay people use for amusement is occasionally carried to the extreme of being jargon. One such style is called Esperant’, found in chat rooms and occasionally used at Esperanto conventions. (See Esperantido.)

Artificial variants
One line of verse, taken from the sole surviving example of the original Lingwe uniwersala of 1878, is used idiomatically:
 (it's time).
If this stage of Esperanto had been preserved, it would presumably be used to occasionally give a novel the archaic flavor that Latin provides in the modern European languages.

Various approaches have been taken to represent deviant language in Esperanto literature. One play, for example, originally written in two dialects of Italian, was translated with Esperanto representing one dialect, and Ido representing the other. Other approaches are to attempt to reconstruct proto-Esperanto, and to create de novo variants of the language.

Reconstructions
With so little data available, various attempts have been made to reconstruct what proto-Esperanto may have been like. However, these reconstructions rely heavily on material from the intermediate period of Esperanto development, between the original Lingwe Uniwersala of 1878 and the Unua Libro of 1887. (See Proto-Esperanto.)

De novo creations
There are various "dialects" and pseudo-historical forms that have been created for literary uses in Esperanto. Two of the more notable are a substandard jargon, Popido, and a fictitious "archaic" version of Esperanto called Arcaicam Esperantom. Neither are used in conversation. (See Esperantido.)

False friends
Because Esperanto vocabulary is largely international, it shares many cognates with English. However, because they were often taken from languages other than English, these do not always have their English meanings. Some of the mismatches are:

 (to spare), vs.  (to damage)
 (to jam, obstruct), vs.  (to embarrass)
 (current, up-to-date), vs.  (actual), vs.  (effective)
 (contingent), vs.  (eventual)
 (punctual, on-time), vs.  (accurate)
 (to check, keep track of), vs.  (to control)
 (suitable), vs.  (convenient)
 (dividend income), vs.  (rent)
 (section), vs.  (paragraph)

Dictionaries
 (English: The Complete Illustrated Dictionary of Esperanto, abbreviated PIV) is the largest monolingual dictionary of the language and is generally regarded as the standard. (There is a free online version at vortaro.net.) However, it is subject to criticism, for example for failure to distinguish rare, idiosyncratic, redundant, or even erroneous words attested in a few written texts from their conversational equivalents, and for giving French approximations of some difficult words rather than their Zamenhofian meanings. The older , originally published in 1930 and reissued with an appendix in 1953, is still widely used, as more portable and less expensive than the PIV, and perhaps more accurate, even if somewhat dated. The  (five volumes, 1989–2001) gives source-language etymologies of all fundamental and official root words (tentative and uncertain in a few cases), along with comparisons of equivalent words in four other constructed international auxiliary languages.

See also
 Esperanto grammar
 Word derivation by native speakers
 Esperanto lexicographers
 
 Special Esperanto adverbs
 Esperanto words with the suffix -um
 Esperanto profanity

Notes

External links
 Reta Vortaro, multilingual Esperanto dictionary
 vortaro.net,  online

Vocabulary
Lexis (linguistics)